Line Walker: The Prelude, also known as Line Walker 2, is a 2017 crime drama produced by TVB. Premiered on September 18, 2017, it serves as the prequel to Line Walker (2014). It stars Michael Miu, Moses Chan, Jessica Hsuan, Benjamin Yuen, Chau Pak-ho, Priscilla Wong, and Benz Hui.

Michael Miu won My Favourite TVB Actor in a Leading Role at the 2017 TVB Star Awards Malaysia.

A third season taking place three years after the events of Line Walker premiered on November 9, 2020.

Synopsis 
In 2010, Cheuk Hoi (Michael Miu) secretly travels to Bangkok to conduct a drug operation with his undercover agents in Thailand. Despite the success of the mission, all of Cheuk Hoi's undercover agents are killed in a sea of fire. Back in Hong Kong, Cheuk Hoi's good friend CIB Inspector Lai Sui Kuen (Eddie Cheung), is killed by masked gunmen, leaving Cheuk Hoi to take charge of Cheng Suk Mui (Priscilla Wong) who is not yet officially an undercover. Cheuk Hoi knows that Lai Sir still has undercover agents whose identities have been deleted. To learn the truth about Lai Sir's death, Cheuk Hoi works with Cheng Suk Mui to find and secure the remaining of his late-friend's undercover agents while dealing with corrupt officials in the Hong Kong Police Force. Meanwhile, Chum Foon Hei (Benz Hui) swears to avenge the death of his wife and goes head to head with Victor Ngai (Moses Chan), the leader of the Cheung Heung triad.

Cast

Criminal Intelligence Bureau (CIB)

Other main and recurring cast

Development 
After the success of Line Walker, TVB had plans to produce a second season. A poster for Line Walker 2 was introduced at the 2016 TVB Sales Presentation featuring Charmaine Sheh, Benz Hui, and Michael Miu. Lead actor Raymond Lam did not renew his management contract with TVB, and was not considered for Line Walker 2. Sheh ultimately did not return for the second season.

Filming for the drama began in October 2016. Using the working title Line Walker 2, the drama series was jointly produced by TVB and Tencent's Penguin Pictures. A pre-filming ceremony held on November 2 introduced returning cast members Michael Miu, Benz Hui, and Vincent Lam, with Moses Chan, Jessica Hsuan, Benjamin Yuen, Chau Pakho, and Priscilla Wong joining the cast. Kenny Wong, Louisa Mak, Alice Chan, and Kandy Wong were also present. Filming took place in Hong Kong, Bangkok, and Shenzhen.

See also 
Line Walker

References 

TVB dramas
Hong Kong television series
2010s Hong Kong television series
Television series by Tencent Penguin Pictures
Triad (organized crime)